The 2016–17 season is FC Barcelona Lassa's 91st in existence and the club's 34th consecutive season in the top flight of Spanish basketball and the 17th consecutive season in the top flight of European basketball. Barcelona is involved in four competitions.

Players

Squad information

Players in

|}

Total spending:  €2,250,000

Players out

|}

Total income:  €2,000,000

Total expenditure:  €250,000

Club

Technical staff

Kit
Supplier: Nike / Sponsor: Lassa Tyres

Pre-season and friendlies

Competitions

Overall

Overview

Supercopa de España

Liga ACB

League table

Results summary

Results by round

Matches

Results overview

EuroLeague

League table

Results summary

Results by round

Matches

Results overview

Copa del Rey

Statistics

Liga ACB

EuroLeague

Copa del Rey

Supercopa de España

References

External links
 Official website
 FC Barcelona Lassa at ACB.com 
 FC Barcelona Lassa at EuroLeague.net

 
Barcelona
Barcelona